The Solar System comprises the Sun and the objects that orbit it, including the satellites of those objects.

Solar System may also refer to:
 a photovoltaic system, alternately called a "solar system"
 a planetary system, sometimes referred to as a "solar system"
 The Solar System (film), a 2017 Peruvian-Spanish comedy-drama film
 Solar System (song), a song by the Beach Boys
 "II. Solar System", a song by the Microphones from Mount Eerie